The 1934 German Ice Hockey Championship was the 18th season of the German Ice Hockey Championship, the national championship of Germany. SC Brandenburg Berlin won the championship by defeating SC Riessersee in the final.

First round

Quarterfinals

Semifinals

3rd place

Final

Losers round

References

External links
German ice hockey standings 1933-1945
Ger
German Ice Hockey Championship seasons
Champ